Thelma Madrigal (born Thelma Madrigal Gálvez on December 31, 1983) is a Mexican actress, model and ballerina.

Career 
Madrigal began her career in television in 2010, in the telenovela Para volver a amar, Mexican version of the Colombian telenovela El último matrimonio feliz, in this project she played Paola González, and thanks to that she was nominated at the 29th TVyNovelas Awards of 2011 in the category Best Female Revelation. 

For the year 2011, the producer Luis de Llano Macedo chose her as a youth protagonist in the telenovela Esperanza del corazón, there she played Lisa, a young dancer who helps her mother to get ahead and fight for love and achieve her dreams. The following year she is nominated at the 30th TVyNovelas Awards of 2012 in the category Best Young Lead Actress. 

In that same year, she played Nisa Casteló in the telenovela La mujer del Vendaval, Mexican version of the Venezuelan telenovela Un esposo para Estela. And also she participated in an episode of the Mexican series Como dice el dicho. A year later she was nominated again at the 32nd TVyNovelas Awards in the category Best Young Lead Actress for her role of Nisa Casteló. 

In 2013, producer Ignacio Sada Madero chose her as the youth protagonist of Por siempre mi amor, adaptation of the 1989 telenovela by Abel Santacruz entitled Mi segunda madre. In 2014, she obtained her first role as a villain, in the telenovela La sombra del pasado, where she shared credits mostly with Pablo Lyle, and Michelle Renaud. She was subsequently nominated again as Best Young Lead actress at the 34th TVyNovelas Awards of 2016. 

In 2015, she obtained his first role as the protagonist in the telenovela Corazón que miente, which started production in the same year, and subsequently premiered in 2016. In that project she shared mostly credits again with Pablo Lyle, with whom he had previously worked in Por siempre mi amor, and La sombra del pasado.

In films the actress has only participated in two, The Last Death in 2011, and Fish Bones in 2018. 

Although her last project was in 2018, she since 2016 has not participated again in other television projects such as series or telenovelas. She recently confirmed that she moved to Colombia, where she currently lives with his family, and that she would be away from Mexican television for a long period unless it is a project carried out between Colombia and Mexico.

Filmography

References

External links

1984 births
Mexican telenovela actresses
Mexican television actresses
Actresses from Mexico City
21st-century Mexican actresses
Mexican female models
Mexican female dancers
Mexican ballerinas
People from Mexico City
Living people